Thymeleaf is a Java XML/XHTML/HTML5 template engine that can work both in web (servlet-based) and non-web environments. It is better suited for serving XHTML/HTML5 at the view layer of MVC-based web applications, but it can process any XML file even in offline environments. It provides full Spring Framework integration.

In web applications Thymeleaf aims to be a complete substitute for JavaServer Pages (JSP), and implements the concept of Natural Templates: template files that can be directly opened in browsers and that still display correctly as web pages.

Thymeleaf is open-source software, licensed under the Apache License 2.0.

Features
From the project's website:
 Java template engine for XML, XHTML and HTML5.
 Works both in web and non-web (offline) environments. No hard dependency on the Servlet API.
 Based on modular feature sets called dialects.
 Dialect features (e.g.: evaluation, iteration, etc.) are applied by linking them to template's tags and/or attributes.
 Two dialects available out-of-the-box: Standard and SpringStandard (for Spring MVC apps, same syntax as Standard).
 Developers can extend and create custom dialects.
 Several template modes:
 XML: validating against a DTD or not.
 XHTML 1.0 and 1.1: validating against standard DTDs or not.
 HTML5: both XML-formed code and legacy-based HTML5. Legacy non-XML code will be automatically cleaned and converted to XML form.
 Full (and extensible) internationalization support.
 Configurable, high performance parsed template cache that reduces input/output to the minimum.
 Automatic DOCTYPE translations –from template DTD to result DTD– for (optional) validation of both template and result code.
 Extremely extensible: can be used as a template engine framework if needed.
 Complete documentation including several example applications.

Thymeleaf example
The following example produces an HTML5 table with rows for each item of a List<Product> variable called allProducts.

<table>
  <thead>
    <tr>
      <th th:text="#{msgs.headers.name}">Name</th>
      <th th:text="#{msgs.headers.price}">Price</th>
    </tr>
  </thead>
  <tbody>
    <tr th:each="prod : ${allProducts}">
      <td th:text="${prod.name}">Oranges</td>
      <td th:text="${#numbers.formatDecimal(prod.price,1,2)}">0.99</td>
    </tr>
  </tbody>
</table>

This piece of code includes:
 Internationalization expressions:  #{ ... } rh
 Variable/model-attribute evaluation expressions:  ${ ... } 
 Utility functions:  #numbers.formatDecimal( ... ) 

Also, this fragment of (X)HTML code can be perfectly displayed by a browser as a prototype, without being processed at all: it is a natural template.

See also
 Template engine (web)
 JavaServer Pages
 Spring Framework
 FreeMarker
 Apache Velocity
 Template Attribute Language

References

External links
 Thymeleaf

Java enterprise platform
Template engines
Java (programming language) libraries
Free software programmed in Java (programming language)